Swimmer is the debut studio album from Scottish pop band The Big Dish, which was released by Virgin in 1986.

The album contains three singles: "Slide", "Prospect Street" and "Christina's World". "Christina's World" reached No. 84 in the UK Singles Chart in January 1987 and "Slide" peaked at No. 86 in May 1987.

Critical reception

On its release, Music & Media picked Swimmer as one of their "Albums of the Week" during October 1986. They described the songs as "alternating between guitar-influenced and atmospheric, melodic material". They also noted Lindsay's "strong vocals" which "lift the material up to a higher plane". Billboard noted the band's "strong song sense" but added that "what may catch ears is the vocalizing of David Byrne sound-alike Steven Lindsay." Cash Box wrote, "Lindsay's whispy voice and strong-based songwriting recommend the group to a wide audience. The band is at its best on heartfelt, melody-rich songs like 'Prospect Street' and 'Slide'."

Paul Massey of the Evening Express noted, "Warmth and sincerity are the trademarks of Lindsay's mellow pop and the single 'Slide' is simply great." Martin Wells of the Derby Evening Telegraph described Swimmer as containing "some delightful Orange Juice/Lloyd Cole-style pop songs".

Brant Houston of the Hartford Courant described Swimmer as "a persuasive effort but sometimes too tidy". He added, "The songs are often sprightly, with '60s-like choruses that keep afloat the tunes that tend toward the moribund." Jim Zebora of the Record-Journal as "accessible, insistent pop" but that the band "has a tendency to fall into mediocrity with many songs".

In a retrospective review, William Ruhlmann of AllMusic considered the album's material to be "tasteful, cultured and a bit dull". He commented, "The guitars chime, the machine-made beats burble, and Lindsay contemplates existence, but there is a difference between swimming and treading water that he doesn't seem to recognize."

Track listing

Personnel
The Big Dish
 Steven Lindsay – vocals, guitar, keyboards
 Brian McFie – lead guitar, second guitar
 Raymond Docherty – bass

Additional musicians
 Ian Ritchie – programming, saxophone

Production
 Ian Ritchie – producer (tracks 1–3, 6–7, 9–11, 13)
 Chris Sheldon – engineer (tracks 1–3, 6–7, 9–11, 13)
 Paul Hardiman – producer (track 4)
 Glyn Johns – producer (tracks 5, 12)
 The Big Dish – producers (track 8)

Other
 Gary Wathen – art direction
 Red Ranch – design
 Heather Angel – photography

Charts

References

1986 debut albums
Virgin Records albums
Warner Records albums